Galatasaray Spor Kulübü (Galatasaray Sports Club) is a Turkish sports club based on the European side of the city of Istanbul in Turkey. Most notable for its association football department, the club also consists of various other departments including basketball, wheelchair basketball, volleyball, water polo, handball, athletics, swimming, rowing, sailing, judo, bridge, motorsport, equestrian, esports, and chess. Galatasaray S.K. is among the key members of the Galatasaray Community Cooperation Committee together with Galatasaray University and the prestigious Galatasaray High School.

The football branch of Galatasaray has accumulated the most Süper Lig (22), Turkish Cup (18) and Turkish Super Cup (16) titles in Turkey, thus making them the most decorated football club in Turkey, as those competitions are the top nationwide professional leagues and cups within the Turkish football system that is recognized and accounted for in accordance to the regulations set by the Turkish Football Federation and UEFA.

In the year 2000 Galatasaray also took claim of the UEFA Cup title by defeating Arsenal F.C. and the UEFA Super Cup, by defeating Real Madrid C.F. These accomplishments makes Galatasaray the only Turkish football club to have reached that level of European success in the history of Turkish Football.

The club's wheelchair basketball team won the Champions Cup in 2008, 2009, 2011, 2013 and 2014. They also won the Kitakyushu Champions Cup and became world champions in 2008, 2009, 2011, and 2012. Galatasaray women's basketball team won the 2013–14 EuroLeague Women and FIBA Eurocup in 2009 and 2018. Galatasaray men's basketball team claimed their first EuroCup championship after defeating Strasbourg in 2016.

Etymology
Galatasaray is a quarter in Karaköy in the Beyoğlu district of Istanbul, located at the northern shore of the Golden Horn. Its name comes from that of Galata, which may in turn have derived from Galatai (meaning the "Galatians"), as the Celtic tribes were thought to have camped at Galata during the Hellenistic period before settling in Galatia in central Anatolia. Galatasaray translates directly as "Galata Palace" (saray means "palace" in Persian). Galatasaray High School, established in the area in 1481, was the progenitor of Galatasaray S.K. as well as other institutions of Galatasaray Community.

Galatasaray is a compound word and is pronounced as such, with a very brief pause between the two words. There is no diminutive form of the club's name. Fans refer to the club either by its full name or by its nickname Cim-Bom(-Bom)—pronounced )—of uncertain etymology. However, the shortened form "Gala" is sometimes used by English speakers.

History

Galatasaray SK was founded in October 1905 (the exact day is disputed, but is traditionally accepted as "17 Teşrinievvel 1321" according to the Islamic Rumi calendar, which corresponds to 30 October 1905 (according to the Gregorian calendar) by Ali Sami Yen and other students of Galatasaray High School (a high school in Istanbul which was established in 1481) as a football club. Ali Sami Yen, who became Galatasaray SK's first president and was given the club's membership number "1", was the son of Şemseddin Sami (Frashëri), an Ottoman writer, philosopher, and playwright of ethnic Albanian origin, and a prominent figure of the Rilindja Kombëtare, the National Renaissance movement of Albania.

The club's first match was against Cadi Keuy FRC and Galatasaray won this game with a score of 2–0. There were discussions about the club's name, in which some suggested Gloria (victory) and others Audace (courage), but it was decided that its name would be Galatasaray.

According to researcher Cem Atabeyoğlu, Galatasaray took its name from one of its first matches. In that match, Galatasaray won 2–0 over Rûm club and the spectators called them "Galata Sarayı Efendileri" (in English: Gentlemen of Galata (City) Palace), and, after this event, they adopted that name and started to call their club "GalataSaray". In 1905, during the era of the Ottoman Empire, there were no laws for associations so the club could not be registered officially, but after the 1912 Law of Association, the club registered legally.

Along with the founder Ali Sami Yen, the co-founders were the ones who were keen to do this sport, such as Asim Tevfik Sonumut, Reşat Şirvani, Cevdet Kalpakçıoğlu, Abidin Daver and Kamil.

At first, the colors of the Galatasaray Sports Club were red and white, which are the colors in the Turkish flag. However, the Turkish Republic was not founded at that time. Therefore, this inspiration caused repressive administration of the day feel uncomfortable and the administration hounded the footballers. For this reason, the colors were changed to yellow and dark blue till 1907. In 1908, new colors were chosen as red and yellow. Ali Sami Yen stated, "We were imagining brightness of yellow – red fire over our team and thinking that it would carry us from one victory to another."

While the football in Turkey began to fully develop, Galatasaray won ten more Istanbul League titles until 1952. Upon recognition of professional football in 1952, the first professional but non-national league of Turkey, Istanbul Professional League played between 1952 and 1959. Galatasaray won three of these seven titles.

Turkcell Super League, the top-flight professional league in Turkish nationwide football, and the most popular sporting competition in the country, formed in 1959. Galatasaray joined all seasons and won 22 league titles since then.

The Turkish Football Federation started to organize "Turkish Cup" (today it is organized with the name Ziraat Turkish Cup) in the 1962–63 season for Turkish clubs to qualify for the UEFA competitions. This is the only national cup competition in Turkey. Galatasaray joined all seasons and won 18 trophies since then.

Crest

Galatasaray's first emblem was a figure of a spread-winged eagle with a football in its beak, drawn by 333 (Galatasaray High School student number) Şevki Ege. This was replaced in 1925 by the current "Ghayn-Sin" crest, designed by Ayetullah Emin.

Team colours and kit

Galatasaray wore red and white colours when founded, then played in yellow and black during the 1907–1908 season.

For a match against the football team of the Royal Navy cruiser , played on 8 December 1908, Galatasaray finally settled on playing in red and yellow.

Ali Sami Yen, the main founder of Galatasaray, wrote the following in his diaries:

“Our goalkeeper Asım Tevfik, left-forwarder Emin Bülent and right midfielder Ali Sami Yen were commissioned for the task of determining the new team colours. After we had been in and out of several shops, we saw two different elegant-looking wool materials in Fat Yanko's store at Bahçekapısı (between Eminönü and Sirkeci in Istanbul, now called Bahçekapı). One of them was quite dark red, resembling the cherry colour, and the other a rich yellow with a touch of orange. When the sales clerk made the two fabrics fly together with a twist of his hand they became so bright that it reminded us of the beauty of a goldfinch. We thought we were looking at the colours flickering in burning fire. We were picturing the yellow-red flames shining on our team and dreaming that it would take us to victories. Indeed it did."

The red and yellow colours were also inspired from the roses which Gül Baba offered to Sultan Bayezid II.

Departments

Current departments

Defunct departments

Wrestling 1887
 İstanbul Championship: Winner(8) 1945 to 1955
 Turkish Championship: Winner(2)
Cycling 1898
Boxing 1904 the first club in Turkey.
The first boxer in Turkey was Sabri Mahir. 
Swedish gymnastics 1908
Hockey 1911
Field hockey 1915
Baseball 1925
Table tennis 1925
Handball 1926
 İstanbul Championship: Winner (8) 1945 to 1955
 Turkish Championship: Winner (2)
Cricket 1926
Aviation & gliding, 1931
Skiing & mountaineering, 1931
Motocross 1931
Fencing 1931
Water ballet 1995
Superleague Formula 2008

Reactivated departments
Tennis 1910
Gymnastics 1868

Achievements in major competitions

Facilities

Stadia

Galatasaray played during its first years in different fields, since there were not any stadiums in Istanbul. In 1921, the first stadium, Taksim Stadium opened. Galatasaray played there until 1940. When the historic Taksim Stadium was demolished, Galatasaray decided to build a large, modern stadium. Due to difficulties stemming from World War II, construction was delayed for over two decades. In this period, they played in İnönü Stadium.

On 20 December 1964, Ali Sami Yen Stadium opened. It was named after the founder of the club, Ali Sami Yen and was in the Mecidiyeköy quarter of the Şişli district at the center of the city. In 1964, the stadium had a capacity of over 35,000. Due to improvements in security and prohibition of standing spectators, it had an all-seater capacity of 24,990 and was nicknamed "Hell".

After 2002, when Atatürk Olympic Stadium was built for Istanbul's Olympic Games bid, Galatasaray started to play European Cup matches there. The attendance record for a Turkish stadium was broken there, in a Galatasaray–Olympiacos match played in front of 79,414 spectators. But the Ali Sami Yen Stadium had historic importance for Galatasaray fans although it was smaller and older.

The new Nef Stadium was built for Galatasaray in return for the highly valued land of the historic Ali Sami Yen stadium in Mecidiyekoy, and became the new home ground for Galatasaray S.K., replacing the old Ali Sami Yen Stadium. The new stadium has a capacity of 52,695 seats. The Ali Sami Yen Stadium was demolished in 2011 with the contractor revealing that it was on the verge of collapse and that a major stadium disaster would almost certainly have occurred had the stadium remained in use

Since 1998, after every goal scored by Galatasaray, the last part of the song "I Will Survive" by the Hermes House Band is played. Although the song is in English and already adopted by Dutch football team Feyenoord, the part used has no lyrics except "la la la la". This makes it easy for fans to participate.

In addition, before every game the Florida State Seminoles' war chant is played accompanied by what the fans call a "scarf show", where fans display and wave their Galatasaray scarves.

Other facilities

 Galatasaray Islet
 Galatasaray Museum
 Florya Metin Oktay Sports Complex and Training Center
 Galatasaray Beyoğlu Hasnun Galip Club Administrative Center
 Galatasaray Küçükçekmece Rowing Center
 Galatasaray Nevzat Özgörkey Equestrian Facilities
 Galatasaray Olympic Aquatic Center
 Galatasaray Gölbaşı Ankara Facilities
 Galatasaray Taçspor Tesisleri

Club officials
 Board of directors

 Presidents

Other businesses

Galatasaray AŞ owns a chain of 81 Galatasaray Stores, selling club merchandise in Turkey, Azerbaijan, Netherlands, Germany, and Northern Cyprus. The club also owns an online betting company, an insurance company, an Internet service provider company, a travel agency, a forex company, and a search engine company.

References
Footnotes

Further reading
 Birand, M. A., & Polat, M. M. (2006). Passion that continues for 100 years. İstanbul: D Yapım. 
 Turagay, U., Özgün, G., Gökçin, B., Ahunbay (2006). 17 May: The story of a championship. İstanbul: D Yapım. 
 Hasol, D. (2004). Dreams/realities in Galatasaray. İstanbul: Yapı Yayın. 
 Tuncay, B. (2003). Galatasaray with European Success and Notable Players.  Yapı Kredi Kü̈ltü̈r Sanat Yayıncılık. 
 Yamak, O. (2001). Galatasaray: Story of 95 years. Sinerji. 
 Çakır, A. (1995). 90 questions about history of Galatasaray SK. Cağaloğlu, İstanbul: Demir Ajans Yayınları. 
 Tekil, S. (1986). History of Galatasaray, 1905–1985. Galatasaray Spor Kulübü. 
 Tekil, S. (1983). Galatasaray 1905–1982: Memories. Arset Matbaacılık Koll. Şti. 
 İsfendiyar, F. (1952). History of Galatasaray. İstanbul: [Doğan Kardeş yayınları].

External links

  Galatasaray Sports Club Official Website

 
Sport in Istanbul
1905 establishments in the Ottoman Empire
Sports clubs established in 1905